The following place names are either derived from Scottish Gaelic or have Scottish Gaelic equivalents:

Endonyms

Scotland 
The place type in the list for Scotland records all inhabited areas as City. There are only eight Scottish cities; they are Aberdeen, Dundee, Dunfermline, Edinburgh, Glasgow, Inverness, Perth and Stirling. The other locations may be described by such terms as town, burgh, village, hamlet, settlement, estate depending on their size and administrative status. The use of the term City for any inhabited area is US usage.

Canada
Names in italics are not on Cape Breton Island, where Canadian Gaelic is still spoken. Each of the place names are in Nova Scotia, which was founded as a Scottish colony.

Exonyms 
The following are Scottish Gaelic placenames for places that do not use Scottish Gaelic:

Australia

Belgium

Canada

France

Greece

Ireland

Israel

Italy

Mexico

New Zealand 
The southern South Island of New Zealand was settled by the Free Church of Scotland, and many of its placenames are of Scottish Gaelic origin (including some directly named for places in Scotland). The placename Strath Taieri combines the Gaelic Srath with the Māori river name Taieri and similarly, the mountain range Ben Ohau combines the Gaelic Beinn with the Māori lake name Ōhau.

Norway

Spain

Sudan

United Kingdom (excluding Scotland) 
Note: most Irish and Scots Gaelic exonyms for places in Wales derive from the Welsh language.

United States

See also 
Place names in Irish
English toponymy
Scottish toponymy
Welsh toponymy
Celtic toponymy

References

Place names
Scottish
Scottish toponymy

Scots Gaelic